Whitley Bay Rockcliff RFC is a rugby union team based in Whitley Bay, North Tyneside in north-east England. The club play in Durham/Northumberland 1 - at the seventh tier of the English rugby union system - following the club's promotion as champions of Durham/Northumberland 2 at the end of the 2018–19 season.

History
The rugby club was founded in 1887 at a large meeting held at Landreth's Hotel [now the Victoria], Whitley...it was resolved to re-establish The Rockcliff Football Club. The proceedings were most enthusiastic and the club commences with a very considerable list of members.".

Rockcliff currently reside in Durham/Northumberland 2 since promotion from Durham/Northumberland 3 in 2005.

Rockcliff rugby club have since been promoted to Durham/Northumberland 1 in the 
2018–2019 season winning every game in the process

Honours 
Northumberland Senior Cup (13): 1890, 1892, 1893, 1894, 1895, 1896, 1898, 1900, 1901, 1902, 1905, 1909, 1920
Durham/Northumberland 1 champions: 1988–89
Durham/Northumberland 2 champions: 2018–19

Notable players
Stan Anderson, one Test match for England in the 1899 Home Nations Championship.

References

English rugby union teams